(or ) "lord of the soil" is the name of a tutelary deity in the Rigveda (RV 4.57, RV 7.35, RV 10.66) and Atharvaveda (AVŚ 2.8.5).

Rigvedic deities
Tutelary deities